(German for The Enchanted Island) is an opera libretto written by German poet and dramatist Friedrich Wilhelm Gotter (1746–1797), after an earlier version by his friend , based on Thomas Shadwell's operatic version of Dryden's The Enchanted Island, itself based on Shakespeare's The Tempest. After Gotter's death his widow was persuaded by Schiller to publish her late husband's libretto in his Die Horen in issues 8 and 9 of 1797. The libretto was first set by Johann Friedrich Anton Fleischmann for a Singspiel that premiered in 1798 in Weimar under Goethe's direction.

Fleischmann's setting however was not notably successful and was overshadowed by the second setting of Die Geisterinsel by  Johann Friedrich Reichardt, which premiered in 1798 in Berlin. Five more settings of the libretto followed in 1879, and another Die Geisterinsel by Johann Rudolf Zumsteeg premiered in 1805 in Dresden.

References

Opera libretti
Operas based on The Tempest